= Corimla =

Area in County Mayo, Ireland

Coordinates: 54.1097°N 9.0731°W

Corimla or Corrimbla is an area approximately 4 kilometres (2.5 mi) east of Ballina, County Mayo in Ireland. Corimla was in County Sligo in 1821 but later became part of County Mayo. The area comprises two townlands, Corimla North (1.3 km^{2} (0.5 sq mi) in area) and Corimla South (3.9 km^{2} (2 sq mi) in area). The more northerly townland, Corimla North (Irish: Corr Imligh Íochtair), is sparsely populated. Corimla South (Corr Imligh Uachtair), along the Bonniconlon road, has a population of approximately 70 people.
